The free floating screed is a device pioneered in the 1930s that revolutionized the asphalt paving process.
The device is designed to flatten the material (e.g. concrete or asphalt) below it, which is also known as screed.

Description 
The free floating screed has a number of forces acting on it that, when in equilibrium, allow the depth behind the screed to be constant.

 Tow arm pull: the force exerted on the screed by the paver dragging it
 Mass: the weight of the screed
 Resistance of the head of material: the opposing force exerted on the screed by the pile of material in front of the screed. This force depends in turn on the material's viscosity and mass.

The angle at which the tow arm pull is exerted on the screed also contributes to the motion; its resultant force is either added or subtracted from the mass of the screed.

If each of these forces is constant, altering the angle of the screed to the horizontal (angle of attack) will control the amount of material extruded behind the screed. Increasing the angle of attack will cause the screed to climb higher through the pile of material, and therefore raise its trailing edge, increasing the amount of material extruded behind the screed. Similarly, reducing the angle of attack will reduce the amount of material extruded.

The free floating screed has become standard because of the smoothing or averaging effect it can have on the existing base course. Since the only connection between the asphalt paver and the screed is the tow arm, the screed can "float" vertically relative to the paver. This allows the paver to traverse uneven ground while the screed floats over the material placed in front of it.

Patent 

The company Barber Greene dominated the market for free floating screed equipment until the patent expired in 1955, and now all major asphalt paver manufacturers use this design principle in their equipment.

See also 
 Road surface

References

External links
 History of Asphalt, National Asphalt Pavement Association

Pavements
Building engineering